Cornelius O'Brien (4 May 1843 – 9 March 1906) was a Canadian Roman Catholic priest, archbishop, and author of 39 books.

Life
Born in New Glasgow, Prince Edward Island, the son of Terence O'Brien and Catherine O'Driscoll, O'Brien graduated from Urban College and in 1871 was ordained a priest.

In 1882, he was appointed Archbishop of Halifax, Nova Scotia. He followed Michael Hannan in this position. 
He established a Catholic high school (1888) and Holy Heart Seminary (1896), both in Halifax and helped to found the French-language Collège Sainte Anne (1890) in Pointe-de-l'Église, Nova Scotia.

In 1894 he delivered a eulogy for the Rt. Hon. Sir John Thompson, a former Premier of Nova Scotia and the first Catholic Prime Minister of Canada. 
From 1896 to 1897, he was president of the Royal Society of Canada.

He died in Halifax on 9 March 1906.
He was buried in the Holy Cross Cemetery, Halifax.

Notes

References
 
 
 
 Peter McGuigan, "Saint Mary's University: the Catholic years, 1838-1971" in Catholic Insight (2005)

1843 births
1906 deaths
19th-century Roman Catholic archbishops in Canada
20th-century Roman Catholic archbishops in Canada
Canadian people of Irish descent
People from Queens County, Prince Edward Island
Roman Catholic archbishops of Halifax